Tanya Roberts (born Victoria Leigh Blum; October 15, 1949 – January 4, 2021) was an American actress. She played Julie Rogers in the final season of the television series Charlie's Angels (1980–1981), Stacey Sutton in the James Bond film A View to a Kill (1985), Sheena in Sheena (1984), Kiri in  The Beastmaster (1982) and Midge Pinciotti on That '70s Show (1998–2004).

Early life
Tanya Roberts was born Victoria Leigh Blum in 1949 (although long given as 1955) either in Manhattan or the Bronx, New York City, to Oscar Blum and his wife Dorothy (née Smith). Oscar Maximilian Blum was born in New York City. Oscar's father, Theodor Blum, has been called "The most outstanding oral surgeon in America" for his pioneering work in local anesthesia and the use of x-rays in dental care.  Theodor was born in Vienna, Austria and emigrated to New York in 1904. Oscar earned a bachelor's degree from Cornell University in 1934 and was a first year student in the medical college there. In 1940, Tanya's father was working as an assistant manager for a music publishing house in New York City. He married in 1945 in Weymouth, England, Dorothy Leigh Smith from Oldham, England. At age 22 Dorothy arrived in New York City in April 1945. In 1948, Dorothy returned to New York from a trip to England with Tanya's two-year-old sister, Barbara. Tanya's father was of Jewish descent and her mother was of English or Irish descent. It has also been reported that her father was of Irish descent and her mother was Jewish. She had one older sister, Barbara. The 1950 U.S. Census shows that the Blum family with the two daughters lived in the hamlet of Hewlett in Hempstead, NY as of April 1950 and that Oscar Blum was a sales executive for a pen manufacturer.  In 1956, Tanya and her sister lived in Scarsdale, New York in a home built in 1950, still standing 70 years later. Tanya's parents purchased the Scarsdale home new in March 1951 and sold it in January 1958 to buy a property in Greenburgh, New York that same month. Tanya's father sold the Greenburgh property on his own in July 1961.  Oscar Blum supported the family on a modest income, working as a fountain pen salesman in Manhattan. The sisters were raised in the central Bronx. 

After meeting psychology student Barry Roberts (while waiting in line for a movie), she proposed to him in a subway station and they were soon married. While Barry pursued a career as a screenwriter, she began to study at the Actors Studio with Lee Strasberg and Uta Hagen under the name Tanya Roberts.

Career

1970s: Early career and Charlie's Angels
Roberts began her career as a model in TV ads for Excedrin, Ultra Brite, Clairol, and Cool Ray sunglasses. She played serious roles in the off-Broadway productions Picnic and Antigone. She also supported herself as an Arthur Murray dance instructor. Her film debut was in The Last Victim (1975). This was followed by the comedy The Yum-Yum Girls (1976). In 1977, as her husband was securing his own screenwriting career, the couple moved to Hollywood. There she was cast in The Private Files of J. Edgar Hoover (1977) and the following year, participated in the drama Fingers. In 1979 Roberts appeared in the cult movie Tourist Trap, Racquet, and California Dreaming. Roberts was featured in several television pilots which were not picked up: Zuma Beach (a 1978 comedy), Pleasure Cove (1979), and Waikiki (1980).

In the summer of 1980, Roberts was chosen from some 2,000 candidates to replace Shelley Hack in the fifth season of the detective television series Charlie's Angels. Roberts played Julie Rogers, a streetwise fighter who used her fists more than her gun. Producers hoped Roberts's presence would revitalize the series's declining ratings and regenerate media interest in the series. Before the season's premiere, Roberts was featured on the cover of People magazine with a headline asking if Roberts would be able to save the declining series from cancellation. Despite the hype of Roberts's debut in November 1980, the series continued to draw dismal ratings and was cancelled in June 1981.

1982–84: B-movies

Roberts played Kiri, a slave rescued by protagonist Dar (Marc Singer) in the adventure fantasy film The Beastmaster (1982), which became a cult film. She was featured in a nude pictorial in Playboy to help promote the movie, appearing on that issue's October 1982 cover. In 1983, Roberts filmed the Italian-made adventure fantasy film Hearts and Armour (also known as Paladini-storia d'armi e d'amori and Paladins — The Story of Love and Arms), based on the medieval novel Orlando Furioso.

She portrayed Velda, the secretary to private detective Mike Hammer, in the television movie Murder Me, Murder You (1983), based on crime novelist Mickey Spillane's iconic Mike Hammer private detective series. The two-part pilot spawned the syndicated television series Mickey Spillane's Mike Hammer. She declined to continue the role in the Mike Hammer series to work on her next project, the 1984 fantasy movie Sheena: Queen of the Jungle, in which she played the main character. The movie was a box-office failure, and garnered her a nomination for "Worst Actress" at the Razzie Awards. The critic Pauline Kael, in a more-balanced review for The New Yorker, describes her as having "a staring, comic-book opaqueness. ... She's a walking, talking icon".

1985–2005: A View to a Kill and That '70s Show
Roberts appeared as Bond girl, geologist Stacey Sutton, in A View to a Kill (1985) with Roger Moore; the first choice for the role was Priscilla Presley. In the wake of this performance, Roberts was nominated for a second Razzie Award. Roberts's other 1980s films include Night Eyes, an erotic thriller; Body Slam (1987), an action movie set in the professional wrestling world (another cult favorite); and Purgatory, a movie about a woman wrongfully imprisoned in Africa. Towards the end of the decade, Roberts recorded the reference footage of The Legend of Zelda used by producers during the creation of the animated adaptation.

Roberts starred in the erotic thriller Inner Sanctum (1991) alongside Margaux Hemingway. In 1992, she played Kay Egan in Sins of Desire. She appeared on the cable series Hot Line in 1995, and in the video game The Pandora Directive in 1996.

In 1998, Roberts took the role of Midge Pinciotti on the television sitcom That '70s Show. In her obituary in The Guardian, Ryan Gilbey praises "[h]er knowing performance" in this role, "slow on the uptake but growing dissatisfied with her life as a housewife". She left the series after the 3rd season in 2001, because her husband had become terminally ill, returning for a few special guest appearances in the 6th and 7th seasons in 2004.

Personal life
Roberts was married to Barry Roberts from 1974 until his death in 2006. They had no children. Roberts lived in Hollywood Hills, California. Some time after his death, she became the partner of Lance O'Brien. Her sister, Barbara Chase, was married to Timothy Leary.

Roberts wrote the foreword to the book The Q Guide to Charlie's Angels (2008). She was described by her publicist as an animal rights activist. During the COVID-19 pandemic, she maintained an active social media presence by hosting video chats on Facebook and Zoom.

Death
While hiking on December 23, 2020, Roberts developed lower intestinal pain and difficulty breathing. She returned home to rest. Very early the next morning she fell out of bed and found she could not get up. She was taken to Cedars-Sinai Hospital, where it was determined she had developed a urinary tract infection that had advanced to sepsis. Her illness was complicated by her history of hepatitis C. The body's immune response to her infection resulted in multi-organ failure. She had to be placed on a ventilator to help her with her breathing. Her partner, Lance O'Brien, was not allowed to see her due to restrictions imposed because of the COVID-19 pandemic. Her condition deteriorated, and on January 3, 2021, she was taken off life support. O'Brien was finally then allowed to visit her. She died on the evening of January 4, at the age of 71.  In a handwritten will, Roberts left her estate to O'Brien.

Roberts' death was announced prematurely by her publicist; moreover, her age of death was incorrectly given as 65 by multiple sources.

Filmography

Film

Television

Video games

References

External links
 
 
 
 
 
 Tanya Roberts at the British Film Institute

1949 births
2021 deaths
Age controversies
20th-century American actresses
21st-century American actresses
Actors Studio alumni
Actresses from New York City
American female models
American film actresses
American television actresses
American people of Irish descent
Entertainers from the Bronx
Female models from New York (state)
Infectious disease deaths in California
Jewish American actresses
American people of English descent
21st-century American Jews